Tatum Municipal Schools is a school district headquartered in Tatum, New Mexico.

Most of the district is in Lea County (including Tatum), while a portion is in Chaves County.

History
Circa 1943 an elementary school gymnasium was built.

In 1957 the district had a total of 650 students. That year a gymnasium was being built at the high school, with a total cost of $678,000.

In 1976 there was a bond election for $1,600,000 with about 50% voter turnout out of more than 600 possible voters; the voting books indicated 709, but some voters had moved away. The bond election succeeded, with 184 votes in favor and 132 votes opposing. Plans included building a new gymnasium for the elementary school, with a proposed cost of $386,000.

References

External links
 

School districts in New Mexico
Education in Lea County, New Mexico
Education in Chaves County, New Mexico